Richard Kingscote is a British jockey who competes in flat racing. He won the 2022 Epsom Derby on Desert Crown.

Background 

Kingscote grew up in Weston-super-Mare in a family with no racing connections and started riding as a child. He attended the British Racing School and was then apprenticed to trainer Roger Charlton.

Career 

Kingscote rode his first winner in 2004. In 2008 he became stable jockey to trainer Tom Dascombe. On 10 July 2008 he achieved his first success in a Group race when winning the Group 2 July Stakes at Newmarket on the Dascombe-trained Classic Blade. He won his first Group 1 race in September 2014 when riding the Dascombe-trained Brown Panther in the Irish St. Leger at the Curragh. In November 2014 he broke his wrist, elbow and collar-bone in a fall at Wolverhampton but recovered in time to ride Brown Panther to victory in the Dubai Gold Cup in March 2015.

On 4 June 2022 Kingscote won the Derby on the 5/2 favourite Desert Crown, trained by Sir Michael Stoute. It was only his second ride in the Derby, having previously been unplaced on Knight to Behold in 2018.

Personal life 

Kingscote is married to pastry chef Ashleigh and has two sons. He rides motorbikes and has many tattoos.

Major wins

 Great Britain
 Epsom Derby - (1) - Desert Crown (2022)
 Champion Stakes - (1) -  Bay Bridge (2022) 

 Ireland
 Irish St. Leger - (1) - Brown Panther (2014)
 Flying Five Stakes - (1) - Havana Grey (2018)

References 

1986 births
Living people
British jockeys
People from Weston-super-Mare